Thevetins are a group of poisonous cardiac glycosides.  They are obtained especially from the seeds of a West Indian shrub or small tree (Cascabela thevetia syn. Thevetia nereifolia) of the dogbane family (Apocynaceae). Hydrolysis products include  glucose, digitalose, and a sterol.

References

Cardiac glycosides